Malvin Ginah Kamara (born 17 November 1983) is a former professional footballer who played as a midfielder or full-back. Born in England, he was capped by Sierra Leone in 2007.

Starting his professional career with Wimbledon in 2003, he remained as the club became the Milton Keynes Dons, before he transferred to Cardiff City in 2006. The following year he moved on to Huddersfield Town via Port Vale. He spent a brief time on loan at Grimsby Town in 2008, before he entered non-league football with Barrow in 2009. Over the next three years he spent brief periods at Guiseley, Forest Green Rovers, Stafford Rangers, Tamworth, Farnborough, Dulwich Hamlet, and Lewes, before he signed for Hampton & Richmond Borough in August 2012.

Club career

Wimbledon and MK Dons
Kamara came through Wimbledon's youth setup, joining on a professional basis in January 2003. His debut came on 21 April 2003 at Selhurst Park, in a 2–0 win over Preston North End. He was a 72nd minute substitute for Patrick Agyemang. He managed to establish himself as a semi-regular in the 2003–04 season, playing 27 First Division games. His first goal came in a 2–1 home defeat to Sunderland on 6 April. His second game eleven days later, in a 3–2 win at the Valley Parade, opening the scoring against Bradford City after just five minutes.

He stuck with the club through their transformation into the Milton Keynes Dons, in the summer of 2004. He made 29 appearances in the MK Dons first ever season, scoring once in the League Cup in a 3–0 at Peterborough United and once in the league against Walsall. He was to play 30 games the following season, as the club suffered relegation from League One.

Cardiff City, Port Vale and Huddersfield Town
In July 2006, after finding out he would not be offered a new contract at the club, Kamara moved on to Cardiff City. He made sixteen appearances for Championship side Cardiff, though made just four starts, scoring once against Wolverhampton Wanderers.

In January 2007, he transferred to Martin Foyle's Port Vale for a nominal fee, and made fourteen league starts before the season's end. His stay at Vale Park proved to be a short one.

In June 2007 he signed with Huddersfield Town. Regular first team football followed in the 2007–08 season as he played fifty games over all competitions for the Yorkshire based club. He scored five goals, including two against Accrington Stanley in the FA Cup First Round tie at the Crown Ground. These goals proved vital in what was a 3–2 win, helping the club to eventually reach the Fifth Round, where they were beaten 3–1 by Chelsea at Stamford Bridge. He joined League Two side Grimsby Town on loan in September 2008, making his debut for the club in a 1–0 defeat by Barnet at Blundell Park on 28 September. He returned to the Galpharm Stadium on 25 October, after playing just two matches at Grimsby. He was released by Huddersfield in May 2009, his three appearances for the club during the 2008–09 season a stark contrast to his virtual ever-presence the season previous.

Non-league
In August 2009, he joined old-club Port Vale on trial, hoping to impress mew manager Micky Adams. The trial ended quickly however, Adams instead opting to look at other options, and Kamara with an offer of a trial at an unnamed League One club. On 25 September 2009, it was announced that Kamara had signed for Conference National side Barrow. He made his debut the following day in Barrow's 3–0 away defeat at Salisbury City. Kamara scored on his home debut three days later in a 3–1 win over Mansfield Town. Despite being a regular starter in the side, Kamara was released due to personal reasons at the start of December. He joined Guiseley of the Conference North in February 2010, but left at the end of the season seeking a professional contract. In the summer he went on trial at Bradford City, but did not sign.

In October 2010 he signed a non-contract deal with Conference National side Forest Green Rovers. After making only a few league appearances he was released in December of that year. In January 2011, Kamara signed for Conference North side Stafford Rangers. Kamara did not play any games for Stafford however before moving back into the Conference. He then signed for Tamworth on 18 January 2011. He made his debut the same day, coming on as a substitute against Altrincham. In March 2011, Karama had his contract cancelled, as did youth players Troy Wallen and Alando Lewis. A few days after his contract was cancelled with the "Lambs", Kamara joined Farnborough in the Conference South. However, he quickly changed his mind, and instead opted to join Dulwich Hamlet in the Isthmian League Division One South. He grabbed a brace for Dulwich in a 5–2 defeat of Chatham Town on 16 April.

He signed for Lewes of the Isthmian League Premier Division in August 2011. The 2011–12 season was turbulent for the "Rooks", with numerous management changes at The Dripping Pan; Lewes ended the season one place and two points outside the play-offs. He switched to league rivals Hampton & Richmond Borough in August 2012.

International career
On 3 June 2007, he picked up his first cap for Sierra Leone in a 2008 Africa Cup of Nations qualification match against Togo in Freetown, which Sierra Leone lost 1–0.

Personal life
The son of Albert and Winifred Kamara, he has an elder brother and a half-sister, as well as a twin-brother Michael, who is the lead singer of funk band Nexus. Kamara himself is something of a soul singer, having taken the mic at a charity concert in January 2005. He had an odd ritual of watching Willy Wonka & the Chocolate Factory before every game in order to calm his nerves.

Kamara entered the energy industry after retiring as a player, and in 2016 co-launched recruitment, consultancy and coaching consultancy firm Vallum Associates.

Career statistics

References

1983 births
Living people
People with acquired Sierra Leonean citizenship
Sierra Leonean footballers
Association football fullbacks
Association football wingers
Cardiff City F.C. players
Sierra Leone international footballers
Sierra Leonean expatriate footballers
Sierra Leonean expatriates in Wales
Expatriate footballers in Wales
Footballers from Plumstead
English footballers
Wimbledon F.C. players
Milton Keynes Dons F.C. players
Port Vale F.C. players
Huddersfield Town A.F.C. players
Grimsby Town F.C. players
Barrow A.F.C. players
Guiseley A.F.C. players
Forest Green Rovers F.C. players
Stafford Rangers F.C. players
Tamworth F.C. players
Farnborough F.C. players
Dulwich Hamlet F.C. players
Lewes F.C. players
Hampton & Richmond Borough F.C. players
English Football League players
National League (English football) players
Isthmian League players
English expatriate footballers
Black British sportspeople
English sportspeople of Sierra Leonean descent